Kachum Mahalleh (also Romanized as Kachūm Maḩalleh) is a village in Chubar Rural District, Haviq District, Talesh County, Gilan Province, Iran. At the 2006 census, its population was 32, in 5 families.

References 

Populated places in Talesh County